Jacques Mathieu Delpech (1777 – 28 October 1832) was a French surgeon born in Toulouse.

He earned his doctorate from the University of Paris in 1801 and spent the next several years as a teacher of anatomy in Toulouse. In 1812 he became a surgeon at Hôtel-Dieu Saint-Eloi in Montpellier, where he remained until his death in 1832.

Delpech is best known for his work in orthopedics, and he established a clinic for orthopaedic diseases at Saint-Eloi. There he advocated a surgical process known as "tenotomy" to correct contracture abnormalities of the extremities. He was also a pioneer of skin grafting and rhinoplasty, and is credited for documenting the first rhinoplastic operation in France.

Delpech died when he was shot by a patient on 28 October 1832.

Partial list of works 
 Réflexions et observations anatomico-chirurgicales sur l’anévrisme (1809), (Translation of Antonio Scarpa's (1752–1832) work on aneurysms).
 Précis des maladies chirurgicales, (1815)
 Considérations sur la difformité appelée pied-bots, (1823)
 Chirurgie clinique de Montpellier, (1823–28) (two volumes)
 De l’orthomorphie par rapport à l´espèce humaine, two volumes with atlas, (1828).

See also
 Listing of the works of Alexandre Falguière

References
 This article is based on a translation of the equivalent article from the French Wikipedia.

External links
 Jacques Mathieu Delpech @ Who Named It

1777 births
1832 deaths
Physicians from Toulouse
French orthopedic surgeons
University of Paris alumni
French murder victims
Deaths by firearm in France
People murdered in France
1832 murders in France